Kidsgrove Athletic F.C. is an English football club based in Kidsgrove, Staffordshire, England currently playing in the Northern Premier League Division One West. The team, nicknamed "The Grove", play their home games at Hollinwood Road, Clough Hall.

History
Football was played in the town of Kidsgrove before the outbreak of World War II saw the team disband. Football was resurrected in when Kidsgrove United was formed which brought a number of players from further afield. Local young men unhappy with this structure formed their own club in 1952 under the name Kidsgrove Athletic. The club joined the amateur Burslem and Tunstall League. They played on the Vickers and Goodwin pitch next to the A50 before deciding not to play football in 1961 to develop a ground on Hollinwood Road, Clough Hall. The club won the Burslem and Tunstall League in 1962 and joined the Staffordshire County League in 1963.

They won the Division Two title in 1963–64 before winning the Division One title in 1965–66. Kidsgrove moved to the Mid-Cheshire League in 1966 a move which caused some controversy. The team thrived in the new league and were crowned champions in 1970–71, 1977–78, 1986–87 and 1987–88 and also won the Mid-Cheshire League Cup in 1968, 1970 and 1986. The club joined the North West Counties Football League in 1990 and were promoted to the Premier Division in 1991–92 due to ground grading. After several seasons of struggle at this level they won the title in 1997–98 and 2001–02 which earned them promotion to the Northern Premier League. Kidsgrove struggled with the step up to the eighth tier narrowly avoiding relegation in 2002–03 and 2003–04. Under the management of Ant Buckle and Darren Twigg they finished in mid-table in 2004–05 and 2005–06. Peter Ward re-joined the club in the summer of 2006 which saw Kidsgrove begin to mount a promotion challenge and they reached the play-offs in 2009–10 but lost out to Glapwell. In 2010–11 Grove missed out on a play-off spot by four points finishing in 7th position.

In 2011–12 Kidsgrove reached the fourth-qualifying round of the FA Cup where they lost 2–0 to Bradford Park Avenue. In the summer of 2012 Peter Ward left the club and was replaced by Shaun Hollinshead however he was sacked in April 2013. Ant Buckle and Darren Twigg took control of the side for the 2013–14 season. Grove had a poor 2013–14 season finishing bottom of the table which saw Ant Buckle replaced by Neil Gill in May 2014. However after a poor start to the 2014–15 campaign Gill was sacked on 7 September 2014, being replaced by Paul Moore four days later. However Moore quit on 22 October 2014 blaming board interference. In his place came former manager Peter Ward.

Ground
Kidsgrove play home matches at Hollinwood Road, in the Clough Hall area of Kidsgrove.

Club records
Kidsgrove have yet to reach the first round of the FA Cup, but did reach the semi-finals of the FA Vase in 1997–98. Athletic have won the Staffordshire Senior Cup five times in 2004, 2007, 2009, 2011 and 2012.

 Best FA Cup performance: 4th qualifying round 2011–12; 2018–19
 Record Attendance: 1,903 v Tiverton Town, FA Vase Semi-final, 21 March 1998
 Record Victory: 23–0 v Cross Heath WMC, Staffordshire Cup 1965
 Record Defeat: 0–15 v Stafford Rangers, Staffordshire Senior Cup, 20 November 2001
 Top goalscorer: 159, Anthony Malbon, 2014–2022

Honours

Leagues
North West Counties Football League Premier Division
 Champions: 1997–98, 2001–02

Mid-Cheshire League
 Champions: 1970–71, 1977–78, 1986–87, 1987–88
 Runners-up: 1968–69, 1985–86

Staffordshire County League
 Champions: 1965–66

Staffordshire County League Division Two
 Champions: 1963–64

Cups
Staffordshire Senior Cup
 Winners: 2004, 2007, 2009, 2011, 2012
 Runners-up: 2008

Northern Premier League Chairman's Cup
 Winners: 2005

North West Counties League Challenge Cup
 Winners: 1998

North West Counties League Floodlit Trophy
 Runners-up: 1999

Mid Cheshire League Cup
 Winners: 1968, 1970, 1986
 Runner-up: 1985, 1987

League history
Source:

References

External links
Kidsgrove Athletic FC at pitchero.com

Football clubs in Staffordshire
Northern Premier League clubs
Association football clubs established in 1952
Kidsgrove
1952 establishments in England
North West Counties Football League clubs
Football clubs in England
Staffordshire County League